The Urban Institute is a Washington, D.C.–based think tank that carries out economic and social policy research to "open minds, shape decisions, and offer solutions". The institute receives funding from government contracts, foundations and private donors. The Urban Institute measures policy effects, compares options, shows which stakeholders get the most and least, tests conventional wisdom, reveals trends, and makes costs, benefits, and risks explicit.

The Urban Institute has been referred to as "nonpartisan", "liberal", and "left-leaning". In 2020, the Urban Institute co-hosted the second annual Sadie T.M. Alexander Conference for Economics and Related Fields with The Sadie Collective in Washington, D.C.

History and funding 
The Urban Institute was established in 1968 by the Lyndon B. Johnson administration to study the nation's urban problems and evaluate the Great Society initiatives embodied in more than 400 laws passed in the prior four years. Johnson hand-selected well-known economists and civic leaders to create the non-partisan, independent research organization. Their ranks included Kermit Gordon, McGeorge Bundy, Irwin Miller, Arjay Miller, Richard Neustadt, Cyrus Vance, and Robert McNamara. William Gorham, former Assistant Secretary for Health, Education and Welfare, was selected as its first president and served from 1968 to 2000.

Gradually, Urban's research and funding base broadened. In 2013, federal government contracts provided about 54% of Urban's operating funds, private foundations another 30%, and nonprofits, corporations and corporate foundations, state and local governments, international organizations and foreign entities, individuals, and Urban's endowment the rest. Some of Urban's more than 100 private sponsors and funders include the Annie E. Casey Foundation, the Bill & Melinda Gates Foundation, the Ford Foundation, the Robert Wood Johnson Foundation, the Henry J. Kaiser Family Foundation, the Charles Stewart Mott Foundation, and the Rockefeller Foundation. Public funding as of the 2020 fiscal year comes from various branches of the United States government including the Department of Justice, Department of Health and Human Services, United States Agency for International Development (USAID), and the United States Department of Agriculture.

Current initiatives 

At any given time 200 or more projects are underway at the institute. New work includes studies on retirement and aging in America, who pays income taxes, state implementation of the Affordable Care Act, working families and their children, immigrant children in US schools, the cost-effectiveness of crime prevention, and the personal and national challenges of long-term unemployment. The institute also studies the family, economic, and societal issues faced by prisoners released from prison. Overseas, UI has had projects in 20 countries, providing technical assistance in decentralization, local governance, and service delivery. Many Urban Institute policy centers are recognized as the leading policy institutes in their fields.

Organization 
Urban Institute's staff of approximately 450 works in several research centers and program areas: the Center on Nonprofits and Philanthropy; Metropolitan Housing and Community Policy Center; Health Policy Center; Education Policy Center; Income and Benefits Policy Center; the Center on International Development and Governance; the Justice Policy Center; the Labor, Human Services, and Population Center and the Low Income Working Families project. The institute also houses the Urban Institute – Brookings Institution Tax Policy Center, the National Center for Charitable Statistics and Urban Institute Press. In 2010, the institute conducted research related to all 50 states and roughly 25 countries.

The Institute works with the Association of Fundraising Professionals to produce the Fundraising Effectiveness Project.  This report provides a summary of data from several different donor software firms and other data providers such as Bloomerang, DonorPerfect, NeonCRM, the Seventh-day Adventist Church, DataLake, DonorTrends, ResultsPlus, and ClearViewCRM.  According to the report, donors gave 3% more in 2016 than 2015, but getting $100 cost nonprofits $95.

Staff 
Sarah Rosen Wartell, a public policy executive and housing markets expert, became the third president of the Urban Institute in February 2012.  She succeeded Robert D. Reischauer, former head of the Congressional Budget Office. Reischauer succeeded William Gorham, founding president, in 2000.

Most Urban Institute researchers are economists, social scientists, or public policy and administration researchers. Others are mathematicians, statisticians, city planners, engineers, or computer scientists. A few have backgrounds in medicine, law, or arts and letters. Since at least 2015, the institute's DEI program has resulted in staff being approximately 60 % female identifying, and 25% minority staff.

Board of trustees 
As of 2018, the board members were: Jamie S. Gorelick (chair), Freeman A. Hrabowski III (vice chair), N. Gregory Mankiw (vice chair), J. Adam Abram, David Autor, Donald A. Baer, Erskine Bowles, Henry Cisneros, Armando Codina, Mitchell E. Daniels Jr., Shaun Donovan, Diana Farrell, Margaret A. Hamburg, Terrence P. Laughlin, Marne L. Levine, Eugene A. Ludwig, Mary J. Miller, Annette L. Nazareth, Deval Patrick, Eduardo Padrón, Charles H. Ramsey, John Wallis Rowe, Arthur I. Segel, J. Ron Terwilliger, Sarah Rosen Wartell and Anthony A. Williams.

Political stance 
The Urban Institute has been referred to as "nonpartisan", "liberal", and "left-leaning". A 2005 study of media bias in The Quarterly Journal of Economics ranked UI as the 11th most liberal of the 50 most-cited think tanks and policy groups, placing it between the NAACP and the People for Ethical Treatment of Animals. According to a study by U.S. News & World Report most political campaign donations by Urban Institute employees go to Democratic politicians. Between 2003 and 2010,  Urban Institute employees' made $79,529 in political contributions, none of which went to the Republican Party.

Assets
As of 2020, the Urban Institute had assets of $212,923,643.

Funding details
Funding details as of 2020:

References

External links 
 
 Urban–Brookings Tax Policy Center
 Audited financial statements and IRS Form 990 filings

 
Liberalism in the United States
Organizations based in Washington, D.C.
Political and economic think tanks in the United States
Think tanks established in 1968
Think tanks based in Washington, D.C.